National Secondary Route 152, or just Route 152 (or ) is a National Road Route of Costa Rica, located in the Guanacaste province.

Description
In Guanacaste province the route covers Santa Cruz canton (Veintisiete de Abril, Tamarindo districts).

References

Highways in Costa Rica